The 2017 Pohang earthquake, measuring magnitude 5.4 on the Richter magnitude scale, struck Heunghae, Pohang, North Gyeongsang Province, South Korea on November 15, 2017. It is tied with the 2016 Gyeongju earthquake as the country's strongest earthquake in modern history, and the most destructive ever recorded with "an estimated 300 billion won (US$290 million) in damage."

Earthquake
The earthquake, along with several aftershocks, caused significant infrastructure damage in the southern port city of Pohang. At least 82 people were injured in the earthquake, including 15 people who were hospitalized. About 1,124 people stayed in temporary shelters after they had to leave their homes.

Result
According to an initial assessment by the Ministry of the Interior and Safety, the earthquake damaged 2,165 private properties, including 1,988 private houses. Of those, 52 homes suffered severe damage and 157 suffered serious damage.

Damage was also reported at 227 schools across the region, 107 of them in Pohang, 44 in Ulsan and 26 in Daegu. Furthermore, damage was reported at 79 public offices and parks, 23 port facilities, 7 roads, 90 shops, 77 factories, and 11 bridges.

Nearly 20,000 people, including soldiers, were mobilized to help clear debris and to assist in restoration works. More than 80 percent of damaged properties were restored within 4 days of the initial earthquake.

A seismograph installed nearby epicenter of this earthquake measured peak ground acceleration (PGA) of 0.58 g; Due to Pohang City's poor subsoil area, seismic wave amplified while passing through, making the damage somewhat heavier than the 5.8 magnitude 2016 Gyeongju earthquake. 0.58 g of PGA is about equivalent to MMI Intensity VIII to IX.

The mainly caused fault of this earthquake was under debate; initially Yangsan Fault was thought to be the cause of this earthquake, however days later Korea Meteorological Administration (KMA) announced that Jangsa fault - a branch fault of Yangsan fault - is main cause of the earthquake. However, Korea Institute of Geoscience and Mineral Resources (KIGAM) analyzed that the unknown fault caused this earthquake. Water injection in the ground by the geothermal plant in Pohang might have also triggered the earthquake.

The College Scholastic Ability Test was delayed by one week both to change testing sites and allow nerves a chance to relax from the quake.

See also
 2016 Gyeongju earthquake
 List of earthquakes in 2017
 List of earthquakes in South Korea

References

External links
 

2017 earthquakes
Earthquakes in South Korea
2017 disasters in South Korea
November 2017 events in South Korea
Pohang